The bus routes in Taichung includes city bus lines belonging to Transportation Bureau, Taichung City Government and highway bus lines belonging to Directorate General of Highways, MOTC. All of the routes are charged according to the mileages. Taichung City Bus is managed by Transportation Bureau, Taichung City Government, and operated by 16 companies.

City Bus Line

Luchan East Station, Luchan West Station, Renyou East Station, Renyou North Station, Gancheng, and Geya Station are closed to Taichung Station. Numbers in red are the routes passing by Taichung Station (Taichung Railway Station) or surrounding Stations.

Operators

The 16 operators of Taichung City Bus are Taichung Bus (台中客運), Fengyuan Bus (豐原客運), Ubus (統聯客運), Renyou Bus (仁友客運), Chuan Hang Bus (全航客運), Geya Bus (巨業交通), Southeast Bus (東南客運), Kuo-Kuang Bus (國光客運), Green Transit (豐榮客運), Ho Hsin Bus (和欣客運), Central Taiwan Bus (中臺灣客運), Miaoli Bus (苗栗客運), Free Go Bus (建明客運), Sifang Bus (四方客運), Lishan Bus (梨山社區發展協會） and Jieshun Bus (捷順交通).

Lishan Bus

1 - 49

50 - 99

101 - 142

151 - 199

200 - 246

250 - 291

300 - 359

After the City Government of Taichung called off the BRT Blue Line System on 8 July 2015, those routes which were prefixed with a "藍" character, which means blue, were regiven new route numbers. The numbers go over 320 and 350. According to the new policy, the routes between 300 and 308 run along the inner bus lane on Taiwan Boulevard, which was adapted from the former BRT Lane.

500 - 989

Highway and Freeway Bus Line

From 1 June 2009, freeway bus lines and highway bus lines use four digit numbers, and they are all managed by Directorate General of Highways, MOTC. The “Original No.” in the below table indicates the No. before then.

See also
 Transportation in Taichung
 Taichung City Bus
 
 List of bus routes in Taipei

References

External links
Taichung City Dynamic Bus Information (zh)
Dynamic Bus Information and Transit System (en)
Transportation Bureau, Taichung City Government
i384, Taichung City Bus Infos

Taichung